Foltz is a surname. Notable people with the surname include:

 Clara Shortridge Foltz, the first female lawyer on the West Coast
 Jerry Foltz, American professional golfer and commentator
 Jonathan M. Foltz, military surgeon of the US Navy during the Mexican-American War and American Civil War
 Philipp Foltz, German history painter
 Richard Foltz, Canadian history scholar, specializing in Iran and religions
 Ryan Foltz, American producer, musician, and former member of Dropkick Murphys
 Vern Foltz, American football player